Wiklino  (German Beckel) is a village in the administrative district of Gmina Słupsk, within Słupsk County, Pomeranian Voivodeship, in northern Poland.

The village has a population of 200.

References

Wiklino